In Greek mythology, Diocorystes (Ancient Greek: Διοκορυστὴς) was an Egyptian prince as one of the sons of King Aegyptus.

Family 
Diocorystes's mother was an Arabian woman and thus full brother of Istrus, Chalcodon, Agenor, Chaetus, Alces, Alcmenor, Hippothous, Euchenor and Hippolytus. In some accounts, he could be a son of Aegyptus either by Eurryroe, daughter of the river-god Nilus, or Isaie, daughter of King Agenor of Tyre.

Mythology 
Diocorystes suffered the same fate as his other brothers, save Lynceus, when they were slain on their wedding night by their wives who obeyed the command of their father King Danaus of Libya. He married the Danaid Hippodamia, daughter of Danaus either by the hamadryads Atlanteia or Phoebe.

Notes

References 

 Apollodorus, The Library with an English Translation by Sir James George Frazer, F.B.A., F.R.S. in 2 Volumes, Cambridge, MA, Harvard University Press; London, William Heinemann Ltd. 1921. ISBN 0-674-99135-4. Online version at the Perseus Digital Library. Greek text available from the same website.
 Tzetzes, John, Book of Histories, Book VII-VIII translated by Vasiliki Dogani from the original Greek of T. Kiessling's edition of 1826. Online version at theio.com

Sons of Aegyptus